Avilenasului is a 2020 Sri Lankan Sinhala road thriller film directed by Chinthana Dharmadasa and produced by Anura Silva for Ashram Films. It stars Shyam Fernando and Samanalee Fonseka in lead roles along with Hemasiri Liyanage and Kumara Thirimadura. Music composed by Indrachapa Liyanage as his debut cinema composing. It is the first road thriller film in Sri Lanka.

Director Chinthana Dharmadasa won the Most Promising Director award at the Derana Film Awards in 2018 for the film. However, film received mixed reviews from critics.

The screening of the film was halted after few days due to the COVID-19 pandemic in Sri Lanka.

Cast
 Shyam Fernando as Kamal Senadilankara		
 Samanalee Fonseka as woman with knife		
 Hemasiri Liyanage
 Priyantha Sirikumara
 Kumara Thirimadura
 Nishantha Priyadarshana
 Ranjith Devanarayana
 Indunil Suranga

References

External links
 
 ආදරය නිතැතින්ම වෛරයෙන් ‘ඇවිලෙනසුලුයි’ -අජිත් පැරකුම් ජයසිංහ

2020s Sinhala-language films
2020 films
Sri Lankan drama films